Joshua is a 2002 American drama film based on the novel of the same name by Joseph F. Girzone. It was produced by Crusader Entertainment LLC and directed by Jon Purdy.

Plot
The movie is about a mysterious man named Joshua (Tony Goldwyn) who appears in a small town named Auburn and begins changing the lives of everyone he meets, simply by being around them.

Joshua takes up residence in a barn that he rents from Joan Casey to use as his home and woodcarving shop. To the surprise of a local priest, the roof does not leak after Joshua moves in, despite the many holes in it.

The more time Joshua spends in town, the more attention he draws to himself simply by doing what he does. He begins by rebuilding the Baptist Church which was destroyed during a storm the year before. He gets the attention of many locals by carrying a huge log of ash through town and out to his barn, some estimates range that it weighs at least 300 pounds.

Later, Father Tordone (F. Murray Abraham) of the local Catholic church hires him to carve a statue of the Apostle Peter, to which Joshua responds that it should be made of ash and that he "knows Peter".

Joshua spends his next few weeks helping out anyone he meets, who in return help him rebuild the Baptist Church. He intervenes in a Tent Revival, where a con artist is tricking people into believing that he is healing people through the power of God. Joshua tells him, "You don't have to do it this way", and proceeds to restore sight to a blind woman sitting in the audience.

Father Tordone becomes very suspicious of Joshua's behavior and motives, and tries to convince the Vatican to step in and stop him before he gains more followers and creates his own cult. It isn't until Joshua resurrects a man (Theo) from the dead that the Catholic Church takes interest in him and invites him to Rome.

Cast 

 Tony Goldwyn as Joshua / Jesus
 F. Murray Abraham as Father Tordone
 Kurt Fuller as Father Pat Hayes
 Stacy Edwards as Maggie
 Giancarlo Giannini as the Pope
 Eddie Bo Smith Jr. as Theo
 Michael Guido as Aaron
 Matt Zeigler as Kevin
 Colleen Camp as Joan Casey
 Marc Grapey as Steve Casey
 Rich Komenich as Ray Persini
 Dale Calandra as Leo Persini
 Cedric Young as Charlie
 Tim Grimm as Bishop Anderson
 Jordan Allen as Michael
 James Meeks as Monroe
 Tim Decker as Reverend Daily

The Christian band Third Day also appears in a concert.

Music
The soundtrack includes music by Michael W. Smith, Jaci Velasquez, Mark Schultz, Point of Grace, and Third Day. Third Day makes an appearance in the film at a concert where they play "Come Together".

Reception and box office
Released April 19, 2002, the film went on to garner $1,461,635 during its run. Its widest theater distribution being 43. Produced on an estimated budget of $9,000,000, the film lost over $7,000,000 and qualified as a box-office bomb as a result.

References

External links

2002 films
2002 drama films
American drama films
Artisan Entertainment films
Paramount Pictures films
Films with screenplays by Brad Mirman
Films based on American novels
Resurrection in film
2000s English-language films
2000s American films